Kees Driehuis (8 December 1951 – 29 October 2019) was a Dutch television presenter.

He was best known as the presenter for the television quiz show Per Seconde Wijzer for 29 years. In total, he presented 794 episodes of the quiz show. Driehuis presented the show for the last time on 1 March 2018. Erik Dijkstra succeeded him as presenter of the show.

He also presented the current affairs programme Nova and the Sunday midday political talkshow Buitenhof.

In 2017, he was the narrator in several episodes of the Sinterklaasjournaal.

He died on 29 October 2019 of bladder cancer at the age of 67.

References

External links

 

1951 births
2019 deaths
20th-century Dutch journalists
21st-century Dutch journalists
Dutch game show hosts
Mass media people from Amsterdam
Deaths from bladder cancer
Deaths from cancer in the Netherlands